Whitehorn station is a CTrain light rail station in Calgary, Alberta, Canada. It serves the Northeast Line (Route 202). The station opened on April 27, 1985, as part of the original Northeast line terminus until another extension, McKnight-Westwinds first opened on December 17, 2007.

The station is located in the median of 36 Street NE, immediately to the north of Whitehorn Drive. The station is 9.8 km from the City Hall Interlocking. 

The station serves the community of Whitehorn and is adjacent to Horizon Industrial Park. 824 parking spaces are also included at the station.

A small bus loop is located on the west side of the station, and was a major hub for bus routes connecting Calgary's far northeastern communities to the CTrain prior to the 2007 extension to McKnight-Westwinds. As of November 2018, this bus loop is no longer in use.

Pedestrian overpasses connect the station to both sides of 36 Street NE. Stairs, escalators, as well as an elevator provide access down to the center-loading platform.  As of 2011, there is now a grade-level access at the South end of the platform as well.

In 2005, the station registered an average transit of 17,400 boardings per weekday.

Whitehorn station has undergone renovations to accommodate 4 car trains and add a second platform entrance at Whitehorn Drive NE as well as upgrades to the station interior. Construction began in the Summer of 2010 and was completed in August 2011.

References

CTrain stations
Railway stations in Canada opened in 1985
1985 establishments in Alberta